Juraj Druska (born 1994) is a Slovak chess player. He was awarded the title of International Master in 2015.

Chess career
He won the CH18 Category of the Slovak Youth Championships in 2012.
He qualified for the Chess World Cup 2021, where he defeated Mircea-Emilian Parligras (1.5/0.5) in the first round, before being knocked out by Jorden van Foreest (1.5/0.5) in the second round.

References

External links

Juraj Druska chess games at 365Chess.com

1994 births
Living people
Slovak chess players